Mordene i Kongo, theatrically as Congo, is a 2018 Norwegian crime film directed by Marius Holst and co-produced by Christian Fredrik Martin and Asle Vatn with South African producer Marlow De Mardt. The film stars Aksel Hennie and Tobias Santelmann in lead roles whereas Ine F. Jansen, Dennis Storhøi, Tone Danielsen and Anthony Oseyemi made supportive roles.

The film was shot in South Africa, and revolves around two Norwegian adventurers, Joshua French and Tjostolv Moland, who are accused of killing their hired chauffeur just before crossing into the eastern part of the Democratic Republic of Congo. The film received mixed reviews from critics. The lead actor Tobias Santelmann was awarded Best Male actor in the Amanda Award 2019. The film was also nominated for Best Photo, Best Sound Design and the People's Amanda sections.

Cast
 Aksel Hennie as Joshua French
 Tobias Santelmann as Tjostolv Moland
 Ine F. Jansen as Ane Strøm Olsen
 Dennis Storhøi as Morten Furuholmen
 Tone Danielsen as Kari Hilde French
 Anthony Oseyemi as General Joseph Kazumba
 Wanga Jawar as Serge Kabondo
 Hakeem Kae-Kazim as Victor Makuni
 Franck Kalala as Katenda Nkulu
 Charles Richard Katanga as Pierre Mawa
 Monda Kinkela as Kisimo Aradjabo
 Tuks Tad Lungu as Congolese Soldier
 Patrick Madise as Abedi Kasongo
 Sipho Mathashala as Gina Kepo Aila
 Jean Serge Ngandu as Pierre Agabo
 Tumelo Nkwanca as Bibiche Olendjeke
 Benike Palfi as Girl - Backpacker's Hostel
 Milton Schorr as German Backpacker
 Christoffer Staib as Halvard Mo

International screening
 Denmark – 29 May 2019	
 Sweden – 15 December 2019	(TV premiere)
 Germany – 6 February 2020	
 Hungary – 6 June 2020	(internet)

References

External links
 
 Trailer of Congo in YouTube

2018 films
Norwegian crime films
2018 crime films